Wick Town and County Hospital is a health facility in Seaforth Avenue, Wick, Scotland. It is managed by NHS Highland.

History
The facility, which was designed by Sinclair Macdonald as an infectious diseases hospital, opened in 1910. The hospital joined the National Health Service in 1948 and a modern extension has since been built on the site. Protesters concerned about the potential closure of the hospital held candlelight meetings in October 2017.

References

NHS Scotland hospitals
1910 establishments in Scotland
Hospitals established in 1910
Hospitals in Highland (council area)
Hospital buildings completed in 1910